This is a list of J. League managers. Some of these managers were appointed as caretaker managers prior to being given a permanent position.

Current managers

J1

 - Albirex Niigata
 - Avispa Fukuoka
 - Cerezo Osaka
 - Gamba Osaka
  Mihailo Petrović - Hokkaido Consadole Sapporo
 - Kashima Antlers
 - Kashiwa Reysol
 - Kawasaki Frontale
 - Kyoto Sanga
 - Nagoya Grampus
 - Sagan Tosu
 - Sanfrecce Hiroshima
 - Shonan Bellmare
 - FC Tokyo
 - Urawa Red Diamonds
 - Vissel Kobe
 - Yokohama FC
 - Yokohama F. Marinos

J2

 - Blaublitz Akita
 - Fagiano Okayama
 - Fujieda MYFC
 - Iwaki FC
 - JEF United Chiba
 - Júbilo Iwata
 - Machida Zelvia
 - Mito HollyHock
 - Montedio Yamagata
 - Oita Trinita
 - Omiya Ardija
 - Renofa Yamaguchi
 - Roasso Kumamoto
 - Shimizu S-Pulse
 - Thespakusatsu Gunma
 - Tochigi SC
 - Tokushima Vortis
 - Tokyo Verdy
 - V-Varen Nagasaki
 - Vegalta Sendai
 - Ventforet Kofu
 - Zweigen Kanazawa

J3

 - Azul Claro Numazu
 - Ehime FC
 - Fukushima United
 - Gainare Tottori
 - FC Gifu
 - Giravanz Kitakyushu
 - FC Imabari
 - Iwate Grulla Morioka
 - Kagoshima United
 - Kamatamare Sanuki
 - Kataller Toyama
 - Matsumoto Yamaga
  Yuki Richard Stalph - Nagano Parceiro
 - Nara Club
 - FC Osaka
 - FC Ryukyu
 - SC Sagamihara
 - Tegevajaro Miyazaki
 - Vanraure Hachinohe
 - YSCC Yokohama

Former managers
 - Shimizu S-Pulse (2018–19)
 - Shimizu S-Pulse (1996–98), Yokohama F. Marinos (2000–01), Tokyo Verdy 1969 (2003–05)
 - Kashima Antlers (2006)
 - Verdy Kawasaki (1994–95), Nagoya Grampus Eight (2003–05)
 - Sanfrecce Hiroshima (1992–93), Vissel Kobe (1995–97, 2006)
 - Kyoto Purple Sanga (1995–96)
 - Urawa Red Diamonds (2004–06)
 - Kashima Antlers (1996–98), Nagoya Grampus Eight (1999–01), Cerezo Osaka (2001), Consadole Sapporo (2003)
 - Kashima Antlers (2000–05)
 - Consadole Sapporo (1997–98)
 - Vissel Kobe (1998)
 - FC Tokyo (2006)
 - Vissel Kobe (2004)
 - Gamba Osaka (1995)
 - Sanfrecce Hiroshima (1995–96)
 - Gamba Osaka (1991–94)
 - Yokohama Flügels (1991–94), Japan national football team (1995–97), Kyoto Purple Sanga (1999-00)
 - Urawa Red Diamonds (1997)
 - Shimizu S-Pulse (1992–94), Verdy Kawasaki (1996), Vissel Kobe (2005)
 - Nagoya Grampus Eight (1994)
 - Japan national team (1997–98), Consadole Sapporo (1999–01), Yokohama F. Marinos (2003–06), Japan national team (2007–2010)
 - Japan national team (1992–93), Júbilo Iwata (1994–96), Kyoto Purple Sanga (1998), Urawa Red Diamonds (2002–03)
 - Urawa Red Diamonds (1995–96, 2007–08)
 - JEF United Ichihara Chiba (2003–06), Japan national team (2006–07)
 - Tokyo Verdy 1969 (2006–07)
 - Vissel Kobe (2005)
 - Shimizu S-Pulse (1998–00), Kashiwa Reysol (2001–02)
 - Yokohama Flügels (1998)
 - Shimizu S-Pulse (1994)
 - Vegalta Sendai (2006)
 - Júbilo Iwata (1997)
 - Sanfrecce Hiroshima (1997–00)
 - JEF United Ichihara (2002)
 - Omiya Ardija (1998–99), Kyoto Purple Sanga (2003)
 - Omiya Ardija (2007)
 - JEF United Ichihara (2001), Nagoya Grampus Eight (2002–03), Vegalta Sendai (2003–04)
 - Nagoya Grampus Eight (2006–07)
 - Nagoya Grampus Eight (1995–96)
 - Nagoya Grampus Eight (1996–97)
 - Japan national under-23 football team (2002–04), Júbilo Iwata (2004–06)
 - JEF United Ichihara (1999–00)

References

J. League
Managers